Ioanna Sacha (born 22 June 1999) is a Greek swimmer. She competed in the women's 100 metre backstroke event at the 2020 European Aquatics Championships, in Budapest, Hungary.

References

External links
 

1999 births
Living people
Greek female swimmers
Greek female backstroke swimmers
Place of birth missing (living people)
Swimmers at the 2015 European Games
European Games competitors for Greece
20th-century Greek women
21st-century Greek women
Mediterranean Games competitors for Greece
Swimmers at the 2022 Mediterranean Games